Caerphilly railway station is a railway station serving the town of Caerphilly, south Wales. It is a stop on the Rhymney Line of the Valley Lines network.  The station is located at Station Road in the south of the town. Facilities include a small shop and a ticket kiosk. A self-service ticket machine was installed near the entrance to the station on 22 December 2008. Several advertising murals depicting holiday travel in various parts of South Wales have been placed on the northbound side of the station in order to improve the 'look' of the station.

History
The first Caerphilly station was on the now-disappeared Taffs Well to Ystrad line. It opened in 1858 and closed in 1871 when the current railway alignment and station opened. The first station was around 250 metres from the current Aber station but on a completely different alignment.

The current station was built in 1871 as part of the Rhymney Railway. It ended up as a four way junction:
To the west at Penrhos junction (on the line from  Junction to Walnut Tree Junction) with the Pontypridd, Caerphilly and Newport Railway
To the east through a tunnel to a junction with the Brecon and Merthyr Railway at Machen, and onwards to Newport Docks

As a result of traffic volume, the station was rebuilt in 1913 to four platforms and a west facing bay platform.

Caerphilly was the terminus of the Rhymney Line from Penarth from 5 September 2008 to 19 September 2008 due to a landslip that blocked the line near Llanbradach railway station due to the poor weather conditions. Replacement bus services operated the route between Caerphilly and Bargoed/Rhymney. Train services subsequently resumed as normal.

Present form
  
With the closure of both junctions and the simplification of the railway to a pure through service as part of the Rhymney Line, the station was rebuilt to a two platform with bus interchange in 1970. The signalling system is currently set up to allow northbound services to terminate in the southbound platform (using a facing crossover) & return directly to Cardiff if required, although this facility is only used during the evenings in the current (May 2013) timetable. The ongoing Valley Lines resignalling scheme will see a new bay platform bought into use at the station for use by terminating trains, which will allow a further increase in service frequencies to/from Cardiff in the future. Plans to develop the station as a transport hub, including a bus interchange, were announced by Caerphilly County Borough Council in October 2022.

Services 
Monday to Saturdays there is a train  every 15 minutes to Penarth via  and every 15 minutes to Bargoed, with one in four running through to Rhymney. This decreases to hourly northbound and half-hourly southbound in the evenings, with some trains from Cardiff terminating & starting back from here.

References

External links

Railway stations in Caerphilly County Borough
DfT Category D stations
Former Rhymney Railway stations
Railway stations in Great Britain opened in 1871
Railway stations served by Transport for Wales Rail
Transport in Caerphilly